Devils in my Details is the third studio album by the electro-industrial band ohGr. It was released in the U.K. and Europe on November 4, 2008, and in the United States on November 5, 2008. It was the only ohGr release through the German label SPV. The album has the actor Bill Moseley providing spoken word poetry during various songs.

The original album title was purportedly Blurry Dotted I's, after Ogre's dog.

During an October 4, 2008, album streaming and discussion, Ogre announced that unreleased songs created during the production of Devils In My Details might be released as an album titled Dsides, though this material has yet to surface.

Track listing

Personnel
Nivek Ogre - voice, keyboards, synthesisers
Mark Walk - guitar, bass guitar, drums
Bill Moseley - poetry/spoken word on tracks 4, 7, 9, 10, & 11

References

External links
devilsinmydetails.com

2008 albums
OhGr albums
SPV GmbH albums